Nepheronia buquetii, the plain vagrant, Buquet's vagrant, or green-eyed monster, is a butterfly of the family Pieridae. It is found throughout Africa.

The wingspan is 45–50 mm for males and 48–56 mm for females. Adults are on the wing year-round, more commonly in winter months.

The larvae feed on Azima tetracantha and Salvadora persica.

Subspecies
 N. b. buquetii (Boisduval, 1836) (northern Senegal, Niger, Nigeria, Democratic Republic of the Congo, Sudan, Ethiopia, Somalia, coast of Kenya, coast of Tanzania, Zambia, northern Namibia, northern Botswana, Mozambique, Zimbabwe, Eswatini, South Africa)
 N. b. buchanani (Rothschild, 1921) (North Africa, south-western Saudi Arabia, Yemen)
 N. b. pauliani Bernardi, 1958 (Madagascar)

References

 Seitz, A. Die Gross-Schmetterlinge der Erde 13: Die Afrikanischen Tagfalter. Plate XIII 14

Butterflies described in 1836
buquetii
Butterflies of Africa
Taxa named by Jean Baptiste Boisduval